Dupleix is an elevated station on line 6 of the Paris Métro in the 15th arrondissement. The track and station form an elevated viaduct in the centre of boulevard de Grenelle. It is named after the nearby rue Dupleix and Place Dupleix, a square commemorating Joseph François Dupleix (1967-1763), marquis of Landrecies and Paris, an administrator and coloniser of India.  The station was the location of the Barrière de Grenelle, a gate built for the collection of taxation as part of the Wall of the Farmers-General; the gate was built between 1784 and 1788 and was demolished in the nineteenth century.

History

The station opened as part of the former line 2 South on 24 April 1906, when it was extended from Passy to Place d'Italie. On 14 October 1907, line 2 South was incorporated into line 5. The station was then incorporated into line 6 on 12 October 1942. 

A manometer is affixed to of the pillars supporting the station, and is perhaps the last surviving public pressure gauge intended for searching for leaks on the city's water supply network.

In 2019, the station was used by 3,221,871 passengers, making it the 154th busiest of the Métro network out of 302 stations.

In 2020, the station was used by 1,839,499 passengers amidst the COVID-19 pandemic, making it the 131st busiest of the Métro network out of 305 stations.

In 2021, the station was used by 2,028,963 passengers, making it the 176th busiest of the Métro network out of 305 stations.

Passenger services

Access 
The station has 2 accesses:

 Access 1: rue Viala
 Access 2: rue Desaix

Station layout

Platforms 
The station is elevated and has a standard configuration with 2 tracks surrounded by 2 side platforms.

Other connections 
The station is also served by line 42 of the RATP bus network.

Nearby 

 Marché de Grenelle (a market open on Sunday and Wednesday mornings)

Gallery

References

Paris Métro stations in the 15th arrondissement of Paris
Railway stations in France opened in 1906